Sohappy v. Smith, 302 F. Supp. 899 (D. Or. 1969), was a federal case heard by the United States District Court for the District of Oregon, decided in 1969 and amended in 1975. It began with fourteen members of the Yakama who sued the U.S. state of Oregon over its fishing regulations. The federal court combined the case with another, United States v. Oregon, in which the U.S. federal government sued the state along with the Yakama, Warm Springs, Umatilla, and Nez Perce tribes.

The ruling issued by judge Robert C. Belloni in 1969 is known as the "Belloni Decision" or the "Fair Share Doctrine." It is an interpretation of the decision in Puyallup Tribe v. Department of Game of Washington (1968).

Belloni's ruling acknowledged the right of several tribes of Native Americans to fish in the Columbia River with minimal regulation by the government of the United States or local governments.

The rights were further clarified in the "Boldt Decision" (United States v. Washington) of 1974.

See also 
Billy Frank Jr.
Corfield v. Coryell

References 

United States Native American case law
United States District Court for the District of Oregon cases
Land use in Oregon
1969 in United States case law
1969 in Oregon
Native American history of Oregon
Yakama